Katissa elegans is a species of spiders in the family Anyphaenidae. It was described from Costa Rica.

References 

 Katissa elegans at the World Spider Catalog

Anyphaenidae
Spiders described in 1909
Spiders of Central America
Taxa named by Nathan Banks